On 5 November 2021, a Beechcraft King Air on approach to the Ubaporanga Airport in Piedade de Caratinga, near Caratinga, Brazil, crashed 4 kilometers from the runway, killing five people on board, including singer-songwriter Marília Mendonça. The airplane involved belonged to PEC Aviation, a Brazilian air taxi operating airline company.

Accident 
During approach, the aircraft struck high-power cables and crashed into a waterfall.

Investigations 
Investigations will be conducted by the Civil Police and the National Civil Aviation Agency of Brazil (ANAC), on preliminary data, the plane with registration number PT-ONJ was up to date and with active registration. The plane and pilot were authorized to perform air taxi service and both pilot and copilot were considered experienced and the flying conditions at the time of the crash were favorable.

At the scene there was a strong odor of fuel but no fire.

On 5 November, the Companhia Energética de Minas Gerais issued a note stating that the aircraft had hit high-power cables in Caratinga, in the Vale do Rio Doce. Preliminary information from pilots who were flying over the area at the same time of the crash corroborate the statement, having witnessed the moment when the twin-engine turboprop aircraft hit the electric cables.

So far, according to the Brazilian Air Force, there is still no information about the dynamics of the accident and its cause. The Civil Police, currently investigating the accident, has ruled out health problems or substance abuse on the part of the pilot and co-pilot.

Victims 
All five people on board were killed. The plane was piloted by captain Geraldo Martins de Medeiros Júnior and copilot Tarciso Pessoa Viana. Marília Mendonça, her uncle and producer were also killed instantly.

See also 
 List of fatalities from aviation accidents

References 

2021 disasters in Brazil
Aviation accidents and incidents in Brazil
Aviation accidents and incidents in 2021
Accidents and incidents involving the Beechcraft King Air
November 2021 events in Brazil
History of Minas Gerais